Ethio-jazz is a blend of jazz music with traditional Ethiopian music, combining the pentatonic scale-based melodies of Ethiopian music with the 12-tone scale and instrumentation of Western jazz music. Other elements in this genre include Afrofunk, soul, and Latin rhythms. The genre originated in the 1950s with Armenian musician Nerses Nalbandian, who created a fusion of Ethiopian and Western music while working at the National Theatre. Ethio-jazz was revolutionized by Mulatu Astatke in the late 1950s. Astatke is considered the father of Ethio-jazz music.

Characteristics
Ethio-jazz is an improvised version of jazz  involving Ethiopian traditional music, and also some elements of Afrofunk, soul and Latin rhythms.

History

Nerses Nalbandian
The origin of Ethio-jazz can be traced to the 1950s with Nerses Nalbandian, a musician of Armenian descent whose family migrated to Ethiopia in 1915. Nalbandian became the leader of Ethiopia's National Opera after his uncle, Kervok Nalbandian, retired. When Emperor Haile Selassie commissioned Nalbandian to compose music for the Ethiopian National Theatre, he created a fusion of traditional Ethiopian music and Western instrumentation. This was considered the basis of the evolution of Ethio-jazz music.

Mulatu Astatke

Multi-instrumentalist Mulatu Astatke has been considered the father of Ethio-jazz. He was born in 1943 in Jimma and developed an interest in music while studying aeronautical engineering in Wales.  He went on to pursue a formal education in music at Holy Trinity College in London. Astatke was interested in promoting traditional Ethiopian music to Western audiences.  Beginning in 1958, he also studied jazz at Berklee College of Music in Boston. There, he successfully combined Ethiopian music with Western jazz and rhythms, conceiving "Ethio-jazz".

List of musicians

 Alemayehu Eshete
 Teshome Mitiku
 Menelik Wossenachew
 Tilahun Gessesse
 Hailu Mergia

References

Ethiopian music
Jazz genres